Tyrone Edmund Power III (May 5, 1914 – November 15, 1958) was an American actor. From the 1930s to the 1950s, Power appeared in dozens of films, often in swashbuckler roles or romantic leads. His better-known films include Jesse James, The Mark of Zorro, Marie Antoinette, Blood and Sand, The Black Swan, Prince of Foxes, Witness for the Prosecution, The Black Rose, and Captain from Castile. Power's own favorite film among those that he starred in was Nightmare Alley.

Though largely a matinee idol in the 1930s and early 1940s and known for his striking good looks, Power starred in films in a number of genres, from drama to light comedy. In the 1950s he began placing limits on the number of films he would make in order to devote more time to theater productions. He received his biggest accolades as a stage actor in John Brown's Body and Mister Roberts. Power died from a heart attack at the age

Family background and early life
Power was born in Cincinnati, Ohio, in 1914, the son of Helen Emma "Patia" (née Reaume) and the English-born American stage and screen actor Tyrone Power Sr., often known by his first name "Fred". Power was descended from a long Irish theatrical line going back to his great-grandfather, the Irish actor and comedian Tyrone Power (1797–1841). Tyrone Power's sister, Ann Power, was born in 1915, after the family moved to California.  His mother was Roman Catholic, and her ancestry included the French-Canadian Reaume family and French from Alsace-Lorraine. Through his paternal great-grandmother, Anne Gilbert, Power was related to the actor Laurence Olivier; through his paternal grandmother, stage actress Ethel Lavenu, he was related by marriage to author Evelyn Waugh; and through his father's first cousin, Norah Emily Gorman Power, he was related to the theatrical director Sir (William) Tyrone Guthrie, the first Director of the Stratford Festival in Canada; and the Tyrone Guthrie Theatre in Minneapolis, Minnesota.

Power went to Cincinnati-area Catholic schools and graduated from Purcell High School in 1931.  Upon his graduation, he opted to join his father to learn what he could about acting from one of the stage's most respected actors.

Early career

1930s

Power joined his father for the summer of 1931, after being separated from him for some years due to his parents' divorce. His father suffered a heart attack in December 1931, dying in his son's arms, while preparing to perform in The Miracle Man. Tyrone Power Jr., as he was then known, decided to continue pursuing an acting career. He tried to find work as an actor, and, while many contacts knew his father well, they offered praise for his father but no work for his son. He appeared in a bit part in 1932 in Tom Brown of  Culver, a movie starring actor Tom Brown. Power's experience in that movie did not open any other doors, however, and, except for what amounted to little more than a job as an extra in Flirtation Walk, he found himself frozen out of the movies but making some appearances in community theater. Discouraged, he took the advice of a friend, Arthur Caesar, to go to New York to gain experience as a stage actor. Among the Broadway plays in which he was cast are Flowers of the Forest, Saint Joan, and Romeo and Juliet.

Power went to Hollywood in 1936. The director Henry King was impressed with his looks and poise, and he insisted that Power be tested for the lead role in Lloyd's of London, a role thought already to belong to Don Ameche. Despite his own reservations, Darryl F. Zanuck decided to give Power the role, once King and Fox film editor Barbara McLean convinced him that Power had a greater screen presence than Ameche. Power was billed fourth in the movie but he had by far the most screen time of any member of the cast. He walked into the premiere of the movie an unknown and he walked out a star, which he remained the rest of his career.

Power racked up hit after hit from 1936 until 1943, when his career was interrupted by military service. In these years he starred in romantic comedies such as Thin Ice and Day-Time Wife, in dramas such as Suez, Blood and Sand, Son of Fury: The Story of Benjamin Blake, The Rains Came and In Old Chicago; in musicals Alexander's Ragtime Band, Second Fiddle, and Rose of Washington Square; in the westerns Jesse James (1939) and Brigham Young; in the war films A Yank in the R.A.F. and This Above All; and the swashbucklers The Mark of Zorro and The Black Swan. Jesse James was a very big hit at the box office, but it did receive some criticism for fictionalizing and glamorizing the famous outlaw. The movie was shot in and around Pineville, Missouri, and was Power's first location shoot and his first Technicolor movie. (Before his career was over, he had filmed a total of 16 movies in color, including the movie he was filming when he died.) He was loaned out once, to MGM for Marie Antoinette (1938). Darryl F. Zanuck was angry that MGM used Fox's biggest star in what was, despite billing, a supporting role, and he vowed to never again loan him out, though Power's services were requested for the roles of Ashley Wilkes in Gone with the Wind, Joe Bonaparte in Golden Boy, and Parris in Kings Row; roles in several films produced by Harry Cohn; and the role of Monroe Stahr in a planned production by Norma Shearer of The Last Tycoon.

Power was named the second biggest box-office draw in 1939, surpassed only by Mickey Rooney. His box office numbers are some of the best of all time.

1940–1943

In 1940, the direction of Power's career  took a dramatic turn when his movie The Mark of Zorro was released. Power played the role of Don Diego Vega/Zorro, a fop by day, a bandit hero by night. The role had been performed by Douglas Fairbanks in the 1920 movie of the same title. The film was a hit, and 20th Century-Fox often cast Power in other swashbucklers in the years that followed. Power was a talented swordsman in real life, and the dueling scene in The Mark of Zorro is highly regarded. The great Hollywood swordsman, Basil Rathbone, who starred with him in The Mark of Zorro, commented, "Power was the most agile man with a sword I've ever faced before a camera. Tyrone could have fenced Errol Flynn into a cocked hat."

Power's career was interrupted in 1943 by military service. He reported to the United States Marine Corps for training in late 1942, but was sent back, at the request of 20th Century-Fox, to complete one more film, Crash Dive, a patriotic war movie released in 1943. He was credited in the movie as Tyrone Power, U.S.M.C.R., and the movie served as a recruiting film.

Military service
In August 1942, Power enlisted in the United States Marine Corps. He attended boot camp at Marine Corps Recruit Depot San Diego, then Officer's Candidate School at Marine Corps Base Quantico, where he was commissioned  a second lieutenant on June 2, 1943. As he had already logged 180 solo hours as a pilot before enlisting, he was able to do a short, intense flight training program at Naval Air Station Corpus Christi, Texas. The pass earned him his wings and a promotion to first lieutenant. The Marine Corps considered Power over the age limit for active combat flying, so he volunteered for piloting cargo planes that he felt would get him into active combat zones.

In July 1944, Power was assigned to Marine Transport Squadron (VMR)-352 as a R5C (Navy version of Army Curtiss Commando C-46) transport co-pilot at Marine Corps Air Station Cherry Point, North Carolina.  The squadron moved to Marine Corps Air Station El Centro in California in December 1944. Power was later reassigned to VMR-353, joining them on Kwajalein Atoll in the Marshall Islands in February 1945. From there, he flew missions carrying cargo in and wounded Marines out during the Battles of Iwo Jima (Feb-Mar 1945) and Okinawa (Apr-Jun 1945).

For his services in the Pacific War, Power was awarded the American Campaign Medal, the Asiatic-Pacific Campaign Medal with two bronze stars, and the World War II Victory Medal.

Power returned to the United States in November 1945 and was released from active duty in January 1946. He was promoted to the rank of captain in the reserves on May 8, 1951. He remained in the reserves the rest of his life and reached the rank of major in 1957.

In the June 2001 Marine Air Transporter newsletter, Jerry Taylor, a retired Marine Corps flight instructor, recalled training Power as a Marine pilot, saying, "He was an excellent student, never forgot a procedure I showed him or anything I told him." Others who served with him have also commented on how well Power was respected by those with whom he served. 

Following the war, 20th Century-Fox provided Power with a surplus DC-3 that he named The Geek  that he frequently piloted.

When Power died suddenly at age 44, he was buried with full military honors.

Post-war career

Late 1940s

Other than re-releases of his films, Power was not seen on screen again after his entry into the Marines until 1946, when he co-starred with Gene Tierney, John Payne and Anne Baxter in The Razor's Edge, an adaptation of W. Somerset Maugham's novel of the same title.

Next up for release was a movie that Power had to fight hard to make, the film noir Nightmare Alley (1947). Darryl F. Zanuck was reluctant for Power to make the movie because his handsome appearance and charming manner had been marketable assets for the studio for many years. Zanuck feared that the dark role might damage Power's image. Zanuck eventually agreed, giving Power A-list production values for what normally would be a B film. The movie was directed by Edmund Goulding, and though it was a failure at the box-office, it was one of Power's favorite roles for which he received some of the best reviews of his career. However, Zanuck continued to disapprove of his "darling boy" being seen in such a film with a downward spiral. So, he did not publicize it and removed it from release after only a few weeks insisting that it was a flop. The film was released on DVD in 2005 after years of legal issues.

Zanuck quickly released another costume-clad movie, Captain from Castile (also 1947), directed by Henry King, who directed Power in eleven movies. After making a couple of light romantic comedies reuniting him with two actresses under contract to 20th Century-Fox, That Wonderful Urge with Gene Tierney and The Luck of the Irish (both 1948) with Anne Baxter. After these films, Power once again found himself in two swashbucklers, Prince of Foxes (1949) and The Black Rose (1950).

1950s
Power was becoming increasingly dissatisfied with his costume roles, and he struggled between being a star and becoming a great actor. He was forced to take on assignments he found unappealing, such movies as American Guerrilla in the Philippines (1950) and Pony Soldier (1952). In 1950, he traveled to England to play the title role in Mister Roberts on stage at the London Coliseum, bringing in sellout crowds for twenty-three weeks. 

Protesting being cast in one costume film after another, Power refused to star in Lydia Bailey with his role going to Dale Robertson; Power was placed under suspension.  Power next appeared in Diplomatic Courier (1952), a cold war spy drama directed by Henry Hathaway which received very modest reviews. It took its place among several other American spy movies, released previously, with similar material.

Power's movies had been highly profitable for Fox in the past, and as an enticement to renew his contract a third time, Fox offered him the lead role in The Robe (1953). He turned it down (Richard Burton was cast instead) and on 1 November 1952, he left on a ten-week national tour with John Brown's Body, a three-person dramatic reading of Stephen Vincent Benét's narrative poem, adapted and directed by Charles Laughton, featuring Power, Judith Anderson and Raymond Massey. The tour culminated in a run of 65 shows between February and April 1953 at the New Century Theatre on Broadway. A second national tour with the show began in October 1953, this time for four months, and with Raymond Massey and Anne Baxter. In the same year, Power filmed King of The Khyber Rifles, a depiction of India in 1857, with Terry Moore and Michael Rennie.

Fox now gave Power permission to seek his own roles outside the studio, on the understanding that he would fulfill his fourteen-film commitment to them in between his other projects. He made The Mississippi Gambler (1953) for Universal-International, negotiating a deal entitling him to a percentage of the profits. He earned a million dollars from the movie. Also in 1953, actress and producer Katharine Cornell cast Power as her love interest in the play The Dark is Light Enough, a verse drama by British dramatist Christopher Fry set in Austria in 1848. Between November 1954 and April 1955, Power toured the United States and Canada in the role, ending with 12 weeks at the ANTA Theater, New York, and two weeks at the Colonial Theater, Boston. His performance in Julian Claman's A Quiet Place, staged at the National Theater, Washington, at the end of 1955 was warmly received by the critics.

Untamed (1955) was Tyrone Power's last movie made under his contract with 20th Century-Fox. The same year saw the release of The Long Gray Line, a John Ford film for Columbia Pictures. In 1956, the year Columbia released The Eddy Duchin Story, another great success for the star, he returned to England to play the rake Dick Dudgeon in a revival of Shaw's The Devil's Disciple for one week at the Opera House in Manchester, and nineteen weeks at the Winter Garden, London.

Darryl F. Zanuck, persuaded him to play the lead role in The Sun Also Rises (1957), adapted from the Hemingway novel, with  Ava Gardner and Errol Flynn. This was his final film with Fox. Released that same year were Seven Waves Away (US: Abandon Ship!), shot in Great Britain, and John Ford's Rising of the Moon (narrator only), which was filmed in Ireland, both for Copa Productions.

For Power's last completed film role he was cast against type as the accused murderer Leonard Vole in the first film version of Agatha Christie's Witness for the Prosecution (1957), directed by Billy Wilder. The film was a critically well-received box-office success. Writing for the National Post in 2002, Robert Fulford commented on Power's "superb performance" as "the seedy, stop-at-nothing exploiter of women". Power returned to the stage in March 1958, to play the lead in Arnold Moss's adaptation of Shaw's 1921 play, Back to Methuselah.

Personal life

Power was one of Hollywood's most eligible bachelors until he married French actress Annabella (born Suzanne Georgette Charpentier) on July 14, 1939. They had met on the 20th Century-Fox lot around the time they starred together in the movie Suez. Power adopted Annabella's daughter, Anne, before leaving for service. In an A&E biography, Annabella said that Zanuck "could not stop Tyrone's love for me, or my love for Tyrone." J. Watson Webb, close friend and an editor at 20th Century-Fox, maintained in the A&E Biography that one of the reasons the marriage fell apart was Annabella's inability to give Power a son, yet, Webb said, there was no bitterness between the couple. In a March 1947 issue of Photoplay, Power was interviewed and said that he wanted a home and children, especially a son to carry on his acting legacy. Annabella shed some light on the situation in an interview published in Movieland magazine in 1948. She said, "Our troubles began because the war started earlier for me, a French-born woman, than it did for Americans." She explained that the war clouds over Europe made her unhappy and irritable, and to get her mind off her troubles, she began accepting stage work, which often took her away from home. "It is always difficult to put one's finger exactly on the place and time where a marriage starts to break up", she said "but I think it began then. We were terribly sad about it, both of us, but we knew we were drifting apart. I didn't think then—and I don't think now—that it was his fault, or mine". The couple tried to make their marriage work when Power returned from military service, but they were unable to do so.

Following his separation from Annabella, Power entered into a love affair with Lana Turner that lasted for a couple of years. In her 1982 autobiography, Turner claimed that she became pregnant with Power's child in 1948, but chose to have an abortion.

In 1946, Power and lifelong friend Cesar Romero, accompanied by former flight instructor and war veteran John Jefferies as navigator, embarked on a goodwill tour throughout South America where they met, among others, Juan and Evita Peron in Argentina. On September 1, 1947, Power set out on another goodwill trip around the world, piloting his own plane, "The Geek". He flew with Bob Buck, another experienced pilot and war veteran.  Buck stated in his autobiography that Power had a photographic mind, was an excellent pilot, and genuinely liked people. They flew with a crew to various locations in Europe and South Africa, often mobbed by fans when they hit the ground. However, in 1948 when "The Geek" reached Rome, Power met and fell in love with Mexican actress Linda Christian. Turner claimed that the story of her dining out with Power's friend Frank Sinatra was leaked to Power and that Power became very upset that she was "dating" another man in his absence. Turner also claimed that it could not have been a coincidence that Linda Christian was at the same hotel as Tyrone Power and implied that Christian had obtained Power's itinerary from 20th Century-Fox.

Power and Christian were married on January 27, 1949, in the Church of Santa Francesca Romana, with an estimated 8,000 to 10,000 screaming fans outside. Christian miscarried three times before giving birth to a baby girl, Romina Francesca Power, on October 2, 1951. A second daughter, Taryn Stephanie Power, was born on September 13, 1953. Around the time of Taryn's birth, the marriage was becoming rocky. In her autobiography, Christian blamed the breakup of her marriage on her husband's extramarital affairs, but acknowledged that she had had an affair with Edmund Purdom, which created great tension between Christian and her husband. They divorced in 1955.

After his divorce from Christian, Power had a long-lasting love affair with Mai Zetterling, whom he had met on the set of Abandon Ship!. At the time, he vowed that he would never marry again, because he had been twice burned financially by his previous marriages. He also entered into an affair with a British actress, Thelma Ruby. However, in 1957, he met the former Deborah Jean Smith (sometimes incorrectly referred to as Deborah Ann Montgomery), who went by her former married name, Debbie Minardos. They were married on May 7, 1958, and she became pregnant soon after with Tyrone Power Jr., the son he had always wanted.

Death

In September 1958, Power and his wife Deborah traveled to Madrid and Valdespartera, Spain to film the epic Solomon and Sheba, directed by King Vidor and costarring Gina Lollobrigida. Probably affected by hereditary heart disease, and a chain smoker who smoked three to four packs a day, Power had filmed about 75% of his scenes when he was stricken by a massive heart attack while filming a dueling scene with his frequent costar and friend George Sanders. A doctor diagnosed the cause of Power's death as "fulminant angina pectoris". Power died while being transported to the hospital in Madrid on November 15, 

Power was interred at Hollywood Forever Cemetery (then known as Hollywood Cemetery) in a military service on  Henry King flew over the service; almost 20 years before, Power had flown in King's plane to the set of Jesse James in Missouri, Power's first experience with flying. Aviation became an important part of Power's life, both in the U.S. Marines and as a civilian. In the foreword to Dennis Belafonte's The Films of Tyrone Power, King wrote: "Knowing his love for flying and feeling that I had started it, I flew over his funeral procession and memorial park during his burial, and felt that he was with me." 

Power was interred beside a small lake. His grave is marked with a gravestone in the form of a marble bench containing the masks of comedy and tragedy with the inscription "Good night, sweet prince." At Power's grave, Laurence Olivier read the poem "High Flight".

Power's will, filed on December 8, 1958, contained a then-unusual provision that his eyes be donated to the Estelle Doheny Eye Foundation for corneal transplantation or retinal study. 

Deborah Power gave birth to a son on January 22, 1959, two months after her husband's death. She remarried within the year to producer Arthur Loew Jr.

Honors

For Power's contribution to motion pictures, he was honored in 1960 with a star on the Hollywood Walk of Fame that can be found at 6747 Hollywood Blvd. On the 50th anniversary of his death, Power was honored by American Cinematheque with a weekend of films and remembrances by co-stars and family as well as a memorabilia display at the Egyptian Theatre in Los Angeles from November 14–16, 2008. Also on display were the two known surviving panels from a large painted glass mural which Power and his wife had commissioned for their home, celebrating highlights of their lives and special moments in Tyrone's career, The December 2, 1952 issue of Look Magazine had also featured this mural in a four-page spread titled "The Tyrone Powers Pose For Their Portraits".

Power is shown on the cover of The Beatles' album Sgt. Pepper's Lonely Hearts Club Band in the third row.  In 2018, Tyrone Power was ranked the 21st most popular male film star in history.

Filmography

Stage appearances 

 Low and Behold, Pasadena Playhouse and Hollywood Music Box Theatre, CA (1933)
 Flowers of the Forest, Martin Beck Theatre, NY (1935–1936)
 Romeo and Juliet, Martin Beck Theatre, NY (1935)
 Saint Joan, Martin Beck Theatre, NY (1936)
 Liliom, the Country Playhouse, Westport CT (1941)
 Mister Roberts, London Coliseum, England (1950)
 John Brown's Body, Broadway Century Theatre, NY (1952–1953)
 The Dark is Light Enough (1955)
 A Quiet Place, The Playwrights Co. (1955–1956)
 The Devil's Disciple, Winter Garden Theatre, London, England (1956)
 Back to Methuselah, Ambassador Theatre, NY (1958)

Radio appearances

References

External links

 
 
 
 
 
 Tyrone Power, King of 20th Century-Fox
 
 Tyrone Power's newsreel appearances at the Associated Press Archive
 Tyrone Power at Virtual History

1914 births
1958 deaths
Military personnel from Ohio
20th-century American male actors
20th Century Studios contract players
American male film actors
American male radio actors
United States Marine Corps personnel of World War II
American people of English descent
American people of French-Canadian descent
American people of German descent
American people of Irish descent
Burials at Hollywood Forever Cemetery
Male actors from Cincinnati
Power family
United States Marine Corps officers
United States Marine Corps reservists
United States Marine Corps pilots of World War II
LGBT male actors
American LGBT actors
Filmed deaths of entertainers